Agathonas Iakovidis (2 January 1955 – 5 August 2020) was a Greek folk singer of rebetiko style. He represented Greece in the Eurovision Song Contest 2013 with Koza Mostra and the song "Alcohol Is Free".

Career

Agathonas Iakovidis was born in Evangelismos in 1955. His parents were refugees from Asia Minor. He was a self-educated student. Agathonas has been involved professionally in music since 1973. After a few years, he released his first album in 1977. Since then, many new albums have been released by Iakovidis.

On 5 August 2020, Iakovidis was found dead in his bed from a heart attack, aged 65.

Discography

Singles

External links

References

1955 births
2020 deaths
20th-century Greek male singers
21st-century Greek male singers
Greek folk singers
Eurovision Song Contest entrants for Greece
Eurovision Song Contest entrants of 2013
People from Thessaloniki (regional unit)